The following low-power television stations broadcast on digital or analog channel 14 in the United States:

 K14AG-D in Circle, etc., Montana
 K14AL-D in Ely, Nevada
 K14AR-D in Glasgow, Montana
 K14AT-D in Ridgecrest, California
 K14BF-D in Wenatchee, Washington
 K14GW-D in Corvallis, Oregon
 K14HC-D in Prescott, Arizona
 K14HG-D in Kingman, Arizona
 K14HT-D in Walla Walla, etc., Washington
 K14HX-D in Lakehead, California
 K14IC-D in Burley, Idaho
 K14IJ-D in Leadore, Idaho
 K14IO-D in Pierre, South Dakota
 K14IU-D in Frenchtown, etc., Montana
 K14JS-D in Cortez, etc., Colorado
 K14JY-D in Walker Lake, Nevada
 K14JZ-D in Peetz, Colorado
 K14KD-D in Frost, Minnesota
 K14KE-D in St. James, Minnesota
 K14KK-D in Flagstaff, Arizona
 K14KL-D in Pleasant Valley, Colorado
 K14LB-D in Idalia, Colorado
 K14LF-D in Willmar, Minnesota
 K14LP-D in Cottage Grove, Oregon
 K14LT-D in Polson, Montana
 K14LW-D in Myton, Utah
 K14LZ-D in Alexandria, Minnesota
 K14MC-D in Lava Hot Springs, Idaho
 K14MI-D in Niobrara, Nebraska
 K14MQ-D in Coos Bay, Oregon
 K14MU-D in Weatherford, Oklahoma
 K14NA-D in Globe & Miami, Arizona
 K14ND-D in Overton, Nevada
 K14NF-D in Jacks Cabin, Colorado
 K14NI-D in Ferndale, Montana
 K14NJ-D in Hot Springs, Montana
 K14NM-D in Anton & Southwest Washington County, Colorado
 K14NR-D in Tyler, Texas
 K14NU-D in Beowawe, Nevada
 K14NY-D in Sayre, Oklahoma
 K14OA-D in Preston, Idaho
 K14OB-D in Eureka, Nevada
 K14OV-D in Snowmass Village, Colorado
 K14PA-D in Rural Juab County, Utah
 K14PF-D in Peoa/Oakley, Utah
 K14PH-D in Baudette, Minnesota
 K14PX-D in Paxico, Kansas
 K14QC-D in Mexican Hat, Utah
 K14QG-D in Alamogordo, New Mexico
 K14QH-D in Butte Falls, Oregon
 K14QP-D in Woodward, etc., Oklahoma
 K14QS-D in Wanship, Utah
 K14QT-D in Texarkana, Texas
 K14QV-D in Childress, Texas
 K14QX-D in Hatch, Utah
 K14QY-D in Rural Sevier County, Utah
 K14QZ-D in Mount Pleasant, Utah
 K14RA-D in Teasdale/Torrey, Utah
 K14RB-D in St. Paul, Minnesota
 K14RC-D in Richfield, etc., Utah
 K14RD-D in Koosharem, Utah
 K14RE-D in Panguitch, Utah
 K14RF-D in Cody, Wyoming
 K14RG-D in Circleville, Utah
 K14RH-D in Henrieville, Utah
 K14RJ-D in Mayfield, Utah
 K14RK-D in Phoenix, Arizona
 K14RL-D in Samak, Utah
 K14RM-D in Laketown, etc., Utah
 K14RN-D in Scipio, Utah
 K14RO-D in St. George, etc., Utah
 K14RP-D in Leamington, Utah
 K14RT-D in Fruitland, Utah
 K14RU-D in Spring Glen, Utah
 K14RV-D in Forsyth, Montana
 K14RW-D in Grants Pass, Oregon
 K14RX-D in Ashland, Montana
 K14RY-D in Malad & surrounding area, Idaho
 K14SA-D in Wray, Colorado
 K14SB-D in Terrace Lakes, Idaho
 K14SC-D in Ashland, Oregon
 K14SD-D in South Lake Tahoe, California
 K14SE-D in McDermitt, Nevada
 K14SF-D in Brewster, etc., Washington
 K14SH-D in Marshfield, Missouri
 K14TF-D in Opelousas, Louisiana
 K14TG-D in Monterey, California
 K14TH-D in Williams, Oregon
 K14TK-D in Santa Maria, California
 K19IF-D in Nephi, Utah
 KAOE-LD in Santa Fe, New Mexico
 KAOM-LD in Sweetwater, Texas
 KAUO-LD in Amarillo, Texas
 KBND-LP in Bend, Oregon
 KDTS-LD in San Francisco, California
 KGCE-LD in Garden City, Kansas
 KIBN-LD in Lufkin, Texas
 KINV-LD in Billings, Montana
 KJCS-LD in Colorado Springs, Colorado
 KLAF-LD in Lafayette, Louisiana
 KMMC-LD in San Francisco, California, uses KDTS-LD's spectrum
 KMMW-LD in Stockton, California
 KNBX-CD in Las Vegas, Nevada
 KNRC-LD in Sparks, Nevada
 KOCY-LD in Oklahoma City, Oklahoma
 KPBN-LD in Baton Rouge, Louisiana
 KPHS-LD in Lovelock, Nevada
 KQPS-LD in Hot Springs, Arkansas
 KQTA-LD in San Francisco, California, uses KDTS-LD's spectrum
 KQUP-LD in Spokane, Washington
 KSAO-LD in Sacramento, California
 KSNV in Las Vegas, Nevada
 KSVT-LD in Twin Falls, Idaho
 KUDF-LP in Tucson, Arizona
 KUKC-LD in Kansas City, Missouri
 KULX-CD in Ogden, Utah
 KVIQ-LD in Eureka, California
 KVQT-LD in Houston, Texas
 KWTC-LD in Kerrville, Texas
 KXBF-LD in Bakersfield, California
 KXLK-CD in Austin, Texas, an ATSC 3.0 station.
 KZDN-LD in Denver, Colorado
 W14CO-D in Clarks Summit, etc., Pennsylvania
 W14CX-D in Knoxville, Tennessee
 W14DA-D in Harpswell, Maine
 W14DK-D in Dagsboro, Delaware
 W14DY-D in Onancock, Virginia
 W14EE-D in Algood, Tennessee
 W14EM-D in Marquette, Michigan
 W14EQ-D in Tupelo, Mississippi
 W14EU-D in Tallahassee, Florida
 WCMN-LD in St. Cloud-Sartell, Minnesota
 WDYC-LD in Cincinnati, Ohio
 WECX-LD in Eau Claire, Wisconsin
 WJKP-LD in Corning, New York
 WLZH-LD in Red Lion, Pennsylvania
 WNLO-CD in Norfolk, Virginia, an ATSC 3.0 station.
 WPDS-LD in Largo, etc., Florida
 WSCG-LD in Beaufort, etc., South Carolina
 WSJP-LD in Aquadilla, Puerto Rico
 WSKC-CD in Atlanta, Georgia
 WTBZ-LD in Gainesville, Florida
 WTME-LD in Bruce, Mississippi
 WVQS-LD in Isabel Segunda, Puerto Rico
 WWTD-LD in Washington, D.C.
 WXIV-LD in Myrtle Beach, South Carolina
 WXSL-LD in St. Elmo, Illinois

The following low-power stations, which are no longer licensed, formerly broadcast on analog channel 14:
 K14IL in Pinedale, etc., Wyoming
 K14JL in Fairbanks, Alaska
 K14JT in Twentynine Palms, California
 K14KO in Portales, New Mexico
 K14LD in Muskogee, Oklahoma
 K14LO in Lordsburg, New Mexico
 K14MN in Fortuna, California
 K14OL-D in Granite Falls, Minnesota
 KAZV-LP in Modesto, California
 KBBA-LD in Cedar Falls, Iowa
 KLKS-LP in Breezy Point, Minnesota
 KMCW-LP in Medford, Oregon
 KNTA-LP in New Braunfels, Texas
 KODT-LP in Salt Creek, Oregon
 KOIB-LD in Columbia, Missouri
 KRHP-LD in The Dalles, Oregon
 KUJH-LP in Lawrence, Kansas
 KVCJ-LP in Incline Village, Nevada
 KWYM-LP in Laramie, Wyoming
 KXPX-LP in Corpus Christi, Texas
 KZDE-LD in Fort Collins, Colorado
 W14CK in Newport, Vermont
 W14DJ-D in Myrtle Beach, South Carolina
 WAGC-LD in Atlanta, Georgia
 WAZH-CD in Harrisonburg, Virginia
 WBDI-LD in Springfield, Illinois
 WDLF-LD in Peoria, Illinois
 WIED-LD in Greenville, North Carolina
 WIIW-LP in Nashville, Tennessee
 WNWE-LD in Lincoln, Nebraska
 WPDZ-LD in Buxton, North Carolina
 WSTQ-LP in Syracuse, New York
 WTPH-LP in Fort Myers, Florida
 WTSD-LP in Wilmington, Delaware
 WWEA-LD in Wausau, Wisconsin

References

14 low-power